Los Colonizadores Airport  is an airport serving Saravena in the Arauca Department of Colombia. The runway is just east of the town.

The runway length includes a  displaced threshold on Runway 16. The Saravena non-directional beacon (Ident: SVA) is located on the field.

Airlines and destinations

See also

Transport in Colombia
List of airports in Colombia

References

External links
OpenStreetMap - Saravena
OurAirports - Saravena
SkyVector - Saravena
FallingRain - Saravena Airport

Airports in Colombia
Buildings and structures in Arauca Department